This page lists public opinion polls in connection with the 1996 Russian presidential election.

First round

Candidates passing the second round are given in bold.

1992 polls

1993 polls

1994 polls

1995 polls

1996 polls

January

February

March

April

May

June

Exit polls

Second round

Polls before runoff

Polls during runoff

Exit polls

Hypothetical polling

With Chernomyrdin

With B. Fyodorov

With S. Fyodorov

With Gaidar

With Lebed

With Nemtsov

With Pamfilova

With Rutskoy

With Yavlinsky

With Yeltsin

With Zhirinovsky

With Zyuganov

Subnational polls

Central Russia

Centralno-Chernozemnyi

East Siberia

Far East Russia

Moscow

North/Northwest Russia

North Caucasus

Saint Petersburg

Tambov Oblast
First round

Urals

Volga

Volga-Vyatka

West Siberia

Sources

Opinion
Presidential
Russia